The Ohio Library and Information Network (OhioLINK) is a consortium of Ohio's college and university libraries and the State Library of Ohio. Serving more than 800,000 students, faculty, and staff at 88 institutions with 117 libraries, OhioLINK's membership includes 16 public universities, 23 community/technical colleges, 48 private colleges and the State Library of Ohio. OhioLINK serves faculty, students, staff and other researchers via campus-based integrated library systems, the OhioLINK central site, and Internet resources.

OhioLINK's mission is to create a competitive advantage for Ohio's higher education community by cooperatively and cost-effectively acquiring, providing access to, and preserving an expanding array of print and digital scholarly resources in order to advance teaching, learning, research, and the growth of Ohio's knowledge-based economy.

OhioLINK offers these main digital collections and services, some of which are open access:

 The Central Catalog, a union catalog of the combined member library collections
 A collection of research databases
 The EJC or Electronic Journal Center, a multi-publisher article database
 The Digital Resource Commons
 The EBC or Electronic Book Center, a multi-publisher book collection
 The Finding Aid Repository (Open Access)
 The Digital Music Center
 The ETD or Electronic Theses and Dissertations Center (Open Access).
eTutoring, a collaborative online tutoring platform for participating member institutions
The OhioLINK Open Course Content Library for Open Educational Resources (Open Access)
 Through a peer-to-peer print sharing network with participating Ohio public libraries in the SearchOhio Network, OhioLINK students, faculty and staff can request public library materials and vice versa. 
Digital preservation of locally ingested and created items such as electronic theses and dissertations using the Rosetta product from Ex Libris.
OhioLINK also supports the member libraries which administer the Regional Book Depository program. These five high-density remote storage facilities are each administered by a member library and the materials housed there circulate through the OhioLINK print lending program.

History
OhioLINK, a cooperative venture of university libraries and the Ohio Board of Regents, grew out of a 1987 recommendation by the board's library committee that "the state of Ohio implement, as expeditiously as possible, a statewide electronic catalog system."

In response to this recommendation, the board established a steering committee representing librarians, faculty, administrators and computer systems managers from campuses throughout Ohio. After meetings, public hearings, and conferences, the committee prepared and distributed a planning paper (November 1988); a Request for Information (February 1989); and a Request for Proposal (August 1989) to initiate a statewide electronic system.

In 1990, OhioLINK selected Innovative Interfaces, Inc to develop the unique software system to create the OhioLINK central catalog and selected Digital Equipment Corporation for the computer hardware base. OhioLINK licensed four databases from University Microfilms International, UMI, for citations to millions of business, newspaper and periodical articles and to academic dissertations. These elements formed the foundation of the growing OhioLINK system of services. In 1992, six universities installed OhioLINK systems and began the ongoing process of building the central catalog. In February 1996, OhioLINK began offering services through the World Wide Web.

OhioLINK is part of Ohio's ongoing tradition in pioneering library automation. The Ohio State University and others in Ohio began integrating campus library systems at an early date. In the 1960s, state funds supported the development of OCLC, then called the Ohio College Library Center. OCLC has since grown into an international organization with a database of 50 million entries representing materials held in more than 10,000 libraries.

On February 4, 2009, OhioLINK suffered a catastrophic hard drive failure.  This affected all major services for several days with the exception of the catalog and the DRC, which were not affected.  The drive failure resulted in data loss on the Electronic Journal Center; a complete reload of the Electronic Journal Center's content was completed six weeks after the initial crash.

In January 2010, Tom Sanville, Executive Director of OhioLINK since 1992, announced his resignation.

John Magill served as Executive Director from 2010 until he left the OhioLINK post in August 2012 to focus on workforce and economic development initiatives at the Ohio Board of Regents.

In October 2012, Gwen Evans was appointed the Executive Director of OhioLINK by then-Chancellor of the Department of Higher Education Jim Petro.

Also in October 2012, OhioLINK was brought under the umbrella of the Ohio Technology Consortium. OH-TECH provides administrative and technical support to Ohio's statewide technology infrastructure, which includes OhioLINK, the Ohio Academic Resources Network (OARnet), and the Ohio Supercomputer Center (OSC). Funded by the Ohio General Assembly through the Ohio Department of Higher Education, OH-TECH reports to the Chancellor of the Ohio Department of Higher Education.

In June 2017, the Department of Higher Education dissolved the eStudent Services division of OH-TECH and incorporated some staff and services into OhioLINK's portfolio. The eTutoring service remained, and OhioLINK began statewide Affordable Learning initiatives focusing on textbook affordability. As a member of the Ohio Open Ed Collaborative, an Ohio Department of Education grant-supported OER initiative, OhioLINK added a custom microsite of OER Commons to host OER course content developed by the members of the grant. In addition, OhioLINK joined the Open Textbook Network as a consortium and the OhioLINK Affordable Learning Ambassadors organize advocacy and information about OER and other affordable textbook initiatives. In 2017, OhioLINK signed statewide deals with what eventually totaled six major commercial textbook publishers for discounted textbooks in the inclusive access model, an initiative that many referred to as groundbreaking because it included almost all higher education institutions in the state of Ohio under one agreement.

In 2017, OhioLINK celebrated its 25th anniversary with a reception at the Ohio Statehouse featuring faculty from member institutions who showcased their research and talked about the support and content OhioLINK provided. OhioLINK published OhioLINK's 25th Anniversary: A Concise History 1992-2017

In October 2020, Amy Pawlowski was appointed the Executive Director of OhioLINK by the Chancellor of the Department of Higher Education Randy Gardner.

Libraries Connect Ohio (LCO)
Libraries Connect Ohio (LCO) is a collaborative effort of OhioLINK and the following library organizations:

 INFOhio (virtual library and information network for all Ohio PreK-12 schools)
 Ohio Public Library Information Network (OPLIN)
 State Library of Ohio

These partners are working together to build and provide the Ohio Web Library, a core collection of information resources and library services for all Ohioans.

References

External links
OhioLINK Home Page
OhioLINK member libraries
OhioLINK: A Concise History 1992–2002
 OhioLINK's 25th Anniversary: A Concise History 1992-2017

Library consortia in Ohio